Iver Steen Thomle (1 March 1812, in Froland – 16 September 1889, in Kristiania) was Norwegian jurist.

He was the son of Erich Andreas Thomle and his wife Mette Maria, née Binneballe. His brother was politician and jurist August Thomle. In 1838 Iver Steen Thomle married Augusta Sophie Smith. She died shortly after, but Thomle married Juliane Marie Heyerdahl in 1845.

Thomle graduated from the University of Christiania in 1833. He held jobs in the lawyer's office of Frederik Stang and later the Ministry of Justice. In 1849 he became County Governor of Nedenes (today: Aust-Agder), a post he held until 1860. He was appointed acting Minister of Justice from September to October 1857.

In 1860 he became a Supreme Court judge. In 1879 he took the dr. juris degree at the University of Copenhagen, and that same year became the seventh Chief Justice of the Supreme Court. He held the position until 1886; as such he was a part of the impeachment trial against the cabinet Selmer in 1883–1884.

References

1812 births
1889 deaths
County governors of Norway
Aust-Agder politicians
Government ministers of Norway
Chief justices of Norway
University of Oslo alumni
University of Copenhagen alumni
People from Froland